Fred McGraw Donner (born 1945) is a scholar of Islam and Peter B. Ritzma Professor of Near Eastern History at the University of Chicago. He has published several books about early Islamic history.

Life
Donner was born in Washington, D.C. and grew up in Basking Ridge, New Jersey, where he attended public schools. In 1968 he completed his Bachelor of Arts degree in Oriental Studies at Princeton University, having interrupted his studies from 1966 to 1967 to pursue the study of Arabic at the Middle East Centre for Arab Studies (MECAS) in the village of Shimlan, Lebanon. From 1968 to 1970 he served with the U. S. Army, seeing duty with U. S. Army Security Agency in Herzogenaurach, Germany in 1969-1970. He then studied oriental philology for a year (1970-1971) at the Friedrich-Alexander Universität in Erlangen, Germany, before returning to Princeton for doctoral work. Donner received his PhD in Near Eastern Studies from Princeton in 1975. He taught Middle Eastern history in the History Department at Yale University from 1975-1982 before taking his position at the University of Chicago in 1982 (The Oriental Institute and Department of Near Eastern Languages and Civilizations). He served as chairman of his Department (1997–2002) and as Director of the University's Center for Middle Eastern Studies (2009–present).

In 2007, he was awarded a Guggenheim Fellowship to examine Arabic papyri from the first Islamic century (seventh century CE) at collections in Paris, Vienna, Oxford, and Heidelberg.

Donner was President of Middle East Medievalists from 1992 until 1994 and served as editor of the journal Al-Usur al-Wusta: The Bulletin of Middle East Medievalists from 1992 until 2011.

Donner was President of the Middle East Studies Association of North America. He has been a member of MESA since 1975, served an earlier term on MESA's Board of Directors (1992-1994) and was awarded MESA's Jere L. Bacharach Service Award in 2008.

Donner is a long-term member of the Middle East Studies Association of North America (MESA), The American Oriental Society, and Middle East Medievalists.

Research
Donner's book The Early Islamic Conquests was published in 1981 by Princeton University Press. He has also published a translation of a volume of the history of al-Tabari in 1993.

In Narratives of Islamic Origins (1998), Donner argues for an early date for the Qur'an text. He responds in particular to the theory of late canonization of the Qur'an proposed by John Wansbrough and Yehuda D. Nevo. The book attempts to explain how concerns for legitimation in the developing Islamic community shaped the themes that are the focus of Islamic historical writing, particularly the themes of prophecy, community, hegemony, and leadership.

Donner's book Muhammad and the Believers: At the Origins of Islam, an account of the early years of the spiritual movement that would come to be known as Islam, was published by Harvard University Press in May 2010. Donner's main argument is that what came to be called Islam began as a monotheistic "Believers' movement" inaugurated by Muhammad which included righteous Christians and Jews as well as those monotheists who followed the teachings of the Qur'an. Only under the rule of Abd al-Malik (685-705) did Islam begin to separate from Christians and Jews. This argument was first presented at a "Late Antiquity and Early Islam" workshop in London in 1993, and published in his article "From Believers to Muslims," which appeared in the journal Al-Abhath 50-51 (2002–2003), pp. 9–53.

Reception
Donner's book The Early Islamic Conquests (1981) has been described as "magisterial" and "a major contribution to the understanding of early Islamic history" (International Journal of Middle East Studies). It is used as a set text for several university courses.

Donner's Muhammad and the Believers has been described as "learned and brilliantly original" in a New York Times review.

On the other hand, orientalist Patricia Crone was critical of the book: she wrote on Tablet that the only direct evidence for Donner's central thesis of an ecumenical early Islam comes from several Quranic verses, while the rest is based on conjecture. According to Crone, The New York Times review of Donner's book indicates that his account of a "nice, tolerant, and open" Islam appeals to American liberals, and it may perform a useful role in educating the broader public, but as a scholarly work "it leaves something to be desired". Other academic reviews have characterized the book as "provocative and largely convincing" and as "a plausible and compelling, if necessarily somewhat speculative, alternate account of the emergence of Islam".

Awards
Donner received a 1994 Quantrell Award for Excellence in Undergraduate Teaching. From 2007 to 2008, Donner held a Guggenheim Fellowship. Donner was appointed a life member of the Scientific Committee of the Tunisian Academy of Sciences, Letters, and Arts in 2012.

Bibliography
 The Early Islamic Conquests (Princeton University Press; 1981) 
 The History of al-Tabari (Vol. 10): The Conquest of Arabia (State University of New York Press; 1993)  (translation)
 Narratives of Islamic Origins: The Beginnings of Islamic Historical Writing (Darwin Press; 1998) 
 Muhammad and the Believers. At the Origins of Islam (Harvard University Press; 2010)  
 Antoine Borrut; Fred McGraw Donner; Touraj Daryaee; Muriel Debié; Sidney Harrison Griffith; Wadād Qāḍī; Milka Levy-Rubin; Suzanne Pinckney Stetkevych; Donald S Whitcomb; Luke B Yarbrough. Christians and Others in the Umayyad State (Oriental Institute of the University of Chicago, 2016) 
 The Articulation of Early Islamic State Structures. Second edition Formation of the classical world (Routledge, 2016)

References

External links
 Entry with the University of Chicago

1945 births
20th-century American essayists
20th-century American historians
20th-century American male writers
21st-century American essayists
21st-century American historians
21st-century American male writers
21st-century American non-fiction writers
American historians
American male essayists
American male non-fiction writers
Scholars of medieval Islamic history
Living people
Members of the Tunisian Academy of Sciences, Letters, and Arts
Middle Eastern studies in the United States
Princeton University alumni
University of Chicago faculty
Academic staff of the University of Erlangen-Nuremberg
Writers about religion and science
Yale University faculty